Mahabubabad Assembly constituency is a ST reserved constituency of Telangana Legislative Assembly, India. It is one among 12 constituencies in Warangal district. It is part of Mahabubabad Lok Sabha constituency .

Banoth Shankar Nayak of Telangana Rashtra Samithi is representing the constituency.

Mandals
The Assembly Constituency presently comprises the following Mandals:

Members of Legislative Assembly

Election results

Telangana Legislative Assembly election, 2018

Telangana Legislative Assembly election, 2014

See also
 List of constituencies of Telangana Legislative Assembly

References

Assembly constituencies of Telangana
Hanamkonda district